The Indonesian National Party of Marhaenism is a political party in Indonesia.

On 26 October 1995, former Indonesian National Party member Supeni established the Indonesian National Union (PNI). With the 1998 fall of President Suharto, came the chance to revive the Indonesian National Party. At a meeting on 20 May 1998 it was decided to change the name of the Indonesian National Union, and on 17 June 1998 the Indonesian National Party (PNI) was declared. It subsequently became known as PNI-Supeni to distinguish it from the other versions of the PNI, all claiming to be descendants of the old party. In December 1998 PNI-Supeni merged with PNI-Masa Marhaen, and contested the 1999 legislative election, winning 0.33% of votes, and gaining one seat in the People's Representative Council. After the election, the party name was changed to Indonesian National Party of Marhaenism so the party could compete in the 2004 elections. On 4 July 2000, Sukmawati Sukarnoputri, one of the daughters of Indonesia's first president, Sukarno, became party chairwoman. The party won 0.8% of the votes and again finished with one seat in the People's Representative Council. The party contested the 2009 legislative election, but won only 0.3 percent of the vote, less than the 2.5 percent electoral threshold, thereby losing its only seat in the People's Representative Council.

References

2002 establishments in Indonesia
Pancasila political parties
Political parties established in 2002
Political parties in Indonesia
Socialist parties in Indonesia